Easington is a constituency created in 1950 represented in the House of Commons of the UK Parliament since 2010 by Grahame Morris of the Labour Party.

Constituency profile
The constituency comprises the majority of the district of the same name, which takes in the coastal portion of the administrative county of Durham. The principal towns are Peterlee and Seaham. A seat of former mining traditions, it is one of Labour's safest in Britain — party firebrand Manny Shinwell was MP  for 20 years.

Constituents' occupations include to a significant degree agriculture and the service sector, however the area was formerly heavily economically supported by the mining of coal, iron ore and businesses in the county still extract gangue minerals in present mining, such as fluorspar for the smelting of aluminium, to the south in the county is Darlington, which has particular strengths in international transport construction, including bridges.  To the north is the large city of Sunderland which has a large service sector.

Boundaries

1950–1974 

 The Rural District of Easington.

Created by the Representation of the People Act 1948 for the 1950 general election from the abolished Seaham constituency,but excluding the Urban District of Seaham Harbour, which was included in Houghton-le-Spring.

1974–1983 

 The Rural District of Stockton; and
 in the Rural District of Easington the parishes of Castle Eden, Easington, Haswell, Hawthorn, Horden, Hutton Henry, Monk Hesleden, Nesbitt, Peterlee, Sheraton with Hulam, Shotton, Thornley, and Wingate.

Gained the Rural District of Stockton from the abolished constituency of Sedgefield. Northern-most parts, including Murton, transferred to Houghton-le-Spring.

1983-2010 

 The District of Easington wards of Acre Rigg, Blackhalls, Dawdon, Dene House, Deneside, Easington Colliery, Easington Village, Eden Hill, Haswell, High Colliery, Horden North, Horden South, Howletch, Murton East, Murton West, Park, Passfield, Seaham, Shotton, South, and South Hetton.

Seaham and Murton returned from the abolished constituency of Houghton-le-Spring. Area comprising the former Rural District of Stockton had been included in the new county of Cleveland, and its contents now distributed between Hartlepool, Stockton North and Stockton South. Southern parts of the District of Easington included in the re-established constituency of Sedgefield.

2010–present 

 The District of Easington wards of Acre Rigg, Blackhalls, Dawdon, Dene House, Deneside, Easington Colliery, Easington Village and South Hetton, Eden Hill, Haswell and Shotton, Horden North, Horden South, Howletch, Hutton Henry, Murton East, Murton West, Passfield, Seaham Harbour, and Seaham North.

Following their review of parliamentary representation in County Durham for the 2010 general election, the Boundary Commission for England made only minor changes to the boundaries of Easington (on the southern part of the boundary with Sedgefield).

In the 2009 structural changes to local government in England, the local authority districts in Durham were abolished and replaced with a single unitary authority; however, this has not affected the boundaries of the constituency.

Political history
Results of the winning party
The area has been held by the Labour Party since the 1922 election (including predecessor seat), when the seat was held by the party leader and Prime Minister Ramsay MacDonald. Labour's majority in the seat has never fallen below 19% (the result in the party's 2019 landslide defeat) in its history, and has only been below 40% three times (in 1979, 1983 and 2019). Labour won a majority of votes in every election from the seat's creation in 1950 until 2019, when their vote share fell below 50% for the first time. The 2015 result made the seat the 27th safest of Labour's 232 seats by percentage of majority.

Results of other parties
The 2015 general election saw an above-average  swing to UKIP of 18.7%; the national average was 9.5% . Prior to 2019, the Conservative Party had last come second in the seat in 2001. Labour's candidate won more than three times that of UKIP in 2015, scoring 61%, although the latter polled the strongest second-place in the seat since 1983. 2017 saw the UKIP vote collapse and the Conservative vote rise, although a slight rise in the Labour vote ensured the majority remained above 40%.

Turnout
Turnout has ranged from 87.7% in 1950 to 52.1% in 2005. It has been somewhat inconsistent with national averages, falling in 1992 and 2005 when national turnout increased.

Members of Parliament

Elections

Elections in the 2010s

Elections in the 2000s

Elections in the 1990s

Elections in the 1980s

Elections in the 1970s

Elections in the 1960s

Elections in the 1950s

See also
List of parliamentary constituencies in County Durham
History of parliamentary constituencies and boundaries in Durham

Notes

References

Parliamentary constituencies in County Durham
Constituencies of the Parliament of the United Kingdom established in 1950